3ality Technica, formerly 3ality Digital, was a Burbank, California based company that specialized in high-definition, live-action stereoscopic digital 3D.  The company developed production systems, image processing software and other technologies that enabled the creation, post-production and distribution of live-action 3D entertainment.

3ality announced their closure in 2022.

Products
3ality Technica provided technology in two categories:  The company's 3Flex camera rig systems enable 3D image acquisition, and have been used in the production of feature films, scripted television shows, and live-action 3D sports broadcasts.

The company's 3Play image processing systems provide dynamic image correction, image manipulation, and multiplexing and demultiplexing algorithms for transporting 3D high-definition content over conventional high-definition infrastructure channels.

In 2012, the company built next-generation stereoscopic 3D system Helix allowing two cameras to be aligned with sub-pixel accuracy.

Production
3ality Technica also provided production services to demonstrate the functionality of its systems.
The company produced the first movie shot completely in live-action digital 3D, U2 3D.
They shot the live-action footage for the first 3D commercial aired during the Super Bowl, Sobe's "Lizard Lake." They shot a 3D episode of Chuck.
They produced the first live 3D broadcast of an NFL football game, and produced (with Fox Sports) the first live 3D broadcast of the BCS Championship Game.
In August, 2009, 3ality Digital announced that it had formed an alliance with Imagica, Corp. to bring stereoscopic live-action 3D production to Asia using 3ality Digital's technology.
In February 2011, 3ality Technica & Digital Revolution Studios produced the 2011 3D Creative Arts Awards "Your World in 3D", which was the first award show filmed in native 3D and televised on 3net 3D channel broadcast on DirectTV. The production was filmed at the Grauman's Chinese Theatre in Hollywood.
In August 2011, they shot Britney Spears's Femme Fatale Tour in Toronto, which was released in DVD/Blu-ray 2D in November. The 3D version of this concert will be available for customers of Samsung's new 3D TVs.

Film productions

References 

3D cinema
3D imaging
Companies based in Burbank, California
Defunct technology companies based in California